Charles Silas Richard Trowbridge (January 10, 1882 – October 30, 1967) was an American film actor.  He appeared in more than 230 films between 1915 and 1958.

Biography
Trowbridge was born in Veracruz, Mexico, where his father served in the diplomatic corps of the United States and his grandfather was the American consul-general. He ran a coffee plantation in Hawaii and worked in architecture before venturing into acting. He was a cousin of author John Townsend Trowbridge.

In 1920, Trowbridge -- with several Broadway credits -- got his major credits as part of Denver's Elitch Theatre's summer stock cast.

Trowbridge's Broadway credits include Dinner at Eight (1932), Ladies of Creation (1931), Congai (1928), The Behavior of Mrs. Crane (1927), We Never Learn (1927), Craig's Wife (1925), It All Depends (1925), The Backslapper (1924), The Locked Door (1924), Sweet Seventeen (1923), The Lullaby (1923), The Last Warning (1922), The Night Call (1921), Just Because (1921), The Broken Wing (1920), Why Worry? (1918), This Way Out (1917), Come Out of the Kitchen (1916) and Daddy Long Legs (1914).

On October 30, 1967, Trowbridge died at age 85 in Los Angeles, California.

Filmography

References

External links

1882 births
1967 deaths
American male film actors
People from Veracruz
Burials at Forest Lawn Memorial Park (Hollywood Hills)
20th-century American male actors
American expatriates in Mexico
American male stage actors